California Senate Bill 50 (SB 50) was a proposed California bill that would have preempted local government control of land zoning near public transit stations and jobs centers. The bill would have also required, at minimum, four-plex residential zoning statewide. The bill was the successor to a similar bill introduced by state senator Scott Wiener in January 2018 as Senate Bill 827 (SB 827); both would have applied to areas within  of frequent transit corridors, including rail stations and bus routes. The bills were sponsored by California YIMBY, a pro-housing lobbying group while they were opposed by local governments, anti-gentrification activists, and suburban homeowners. The bills were written in response to an ongoing housing affordability crisis in California's largest urban areas.

Senate Bill 827 failed to advance from the Senate Transportation and Housing Committee in April 2018, effectively killing it.

In 2019 and 2020, Senator Wiener attempted to pass Senate Bill 50 multiple times both in committee and on the senate floor, culminating in an unsuccessful floor vote on January 31, 2020 which resulted in the bill's demise.

Background

In 2008, Arnold Schwarzenegger signed Senate Bill 375, which encourages transit-oriented development to reduce vehicle miles travelled in the state and to address climate change. The bill was created to help achieve the greenhouse gas reduction goals of the 2006 bill Assembly Bill 32.

Existing state law grants the authority for local zoning from the police power in Article XI, Section 7 of the California Constitution, giving cities and counties local discretion in controlling land use. Localities have exercised these zoning powers in residential areas in various ways; while land in California cities has been historically limited to low density housing (by being zoned for single-family homes and since 2016, single-family homes and up to a 1,200 square foot secondary unit), city and county governments can allow higher density zoning, if they choose. For example, in 2018, the LA County Metro Board of Directors created the Transit Oriented Communities (TOC) program after the passage of Measure JJJ in November 2016, which allows for land zoned for commercial development near transit stations to be developed into residential housing, with between 11 and 27 percent of units required to be reserved for affordable housing.

Legislative history

2018

Senator Wiener, representing San Francisco, introduced Senate Bill 827 on the first day of the 2018 legislative session. Wiener had previously authored Senate Bill 35, a bill to streamline the approval process for residential projects, which was passed by the legislature in 2017.

The bill would have also eliminated minimum requirements for parking and prohibited local design requirements that would lower the amount of space in a new development. The bill would have affected roughly 50 percent of single-family homes in Los Angeles and 96 percent of land in San Francisco.

A similar bill, Senate Bill 828, was introduced by Wiener to amend market-rate housing requirements for local governments and avoided much of the controversy that affected SB 827. Another bill, Assembly Bill 2923, was announced in March 2018 and would require the Bay Area Rapid Transit system (serving the San Francisco Bay Area) to adopt zoning standards that would be accepted by cities and local jurisdictions.

The first revisions to the bill were made in late February, adding pro-tenant provisions to prevent demolition of existing housing and other protections. In April 2018, the bill was amended to reduce the maximum height in "transit rich" areas to approximately four to five stories and remove bus stops with non-frequent service outside of peak periods. The bill was brought to the Senate Transportation and Housing Committee in April, where it was rejected by a vote of 6–4.

2019

Senator Wiener announced that he intended to introduce an updated version of the bill with a new number, 50, in the 2019 legislative session. Senate Bill 50 had the same sponsors as Senate Bill 827.

Wiener added amendments that exempted counties with populations under 600,000 from transit rezoning provisions in a compromise with Marin County senator Mike McGuire. The final bill required similar rezoning near transit, four-plex zoning statewide, and additional rezoning in "jobs-rich" areas. 

In May 2019, Anthony Portantino, chair of the senate appropriations committee, made Senate Bill 50 into a two-year bill with a pocket veto, meaning it would not be eligible for consideration again until the 2020 legislative session.

2020

Senator Wiener reintroduced Senate Bill 50 in January 2020 with additional amendments that gave cities the ability to opt out of its rezoning provisions providing they built the state-mandated amount of housing. 

Senator Portantino, who had blocked the bill in 2019, objected to not being consulted about amendments to the bill and said Wiener did not adopt suggestions from an alternative blueprint developed by a coalition of Southern California governments. Toni Atkins, president pro tempore of the senate, used parliamentary powers to maneuver the bill out of Senator Portantino's committee to prevent it from being blocked from appearing on the senate floor again. 

Following debate in the senate, Senate Bill 50 was defeated on January 31, 2020 after multiple vote attempts garnered at most 18 votes, three shy of the 21 needed to pass into the state assembly. Six senators were absent or abstained from voting.

Political debate

Senate Bill 827

Wiener said he proposed Senate Bill 827 in part to alleviate the state's ongoing housing affordability crisis as well as to address carbon emissions generated by vehicles. Regarding the issue of local control, he stated: "In education and healthcare, the state sets basic standards, and local control exists within those standards. Only in housing has the state abdicated its role. But housing is a statewide issue, and the approach of pure local control has driven us into the ditch." 

The bill was opposed by city councils in Los Angeles, San Francisco, and major suburban cities, by suburban homeowners, and by tenants' rights groups, who argued that additional development would cause gentrification and displace underprivileged residents, especially non-white groups. 

The bill was supported by a group of scholars who stated that it would help reduce decades of racial and economic residential segregation, by national pro-housing groups, and by over 100 executives from the Bay Area technology industry, who voiced their support for the bill in a joint letter.

Senate Bill 50

Senate Bill 50 received coverage from major national newspapers outside of California, with the New York Times and The Atlantic publishing articles and opinion pieces on the bill.

Some scholars questioned the ability of Senate Bill 50 to lower housing prices on its own, with some giving credence to the idea that it was a "luxury housing bill." Senator Wiener said "increasing the supply of market rate housing, over time, will reduce costs."

A study published in Urban Affairs Review found five years after Chicago rezoned land around transit stops for denser market-rate development, speculation caused housing prices to increase in the rezoned areas while housing production did not increase. The author of the study, in an online essay, said the tenant protections in Senate Bill 50 made it different from Chicago's rezoning. The author also acknowledged the need for affordable housing development to address California's housing issues and how more research was necessary to determine the long-term effects of rezoning on housing prices and production.

The mayor of Beverly Hills, who engaged in a broadcast debate with Senator Wiener, questioned why Senate Bill 50 would necessarily impact Southern California while exempting several affluent yet sparsely-populated Bay Area counties. The bill faced opposition from local governments around the state who objected to how the bill would usurp local land use authority. Some mayors endorsed the bill.

Senator Wiener said the passage of an anti rent-gouging bill in the previous year hindered the leverage for passing Senate Bill 50. 

A Los Angeles Times columnist said lawmakers from the greater Los Angeles area delegation were responsible for the demise of Senate Bill 50, and that the fight "had nothing to do with partisan politics" but instead was "all about geography" while a Curbed columnist said opposition from a statewide coalition of affordable housing advocacy organizations was responsible for the defeat of Senate Bill 50.

Independent analyses said most of the development spurred by the bill would have likely happened in the San Francisco Bay area.

Related legislation

In 2016, California lawmakers removed local barriers to accessory dwelling unit (ADU) construction by passing Senate Bill 1069. This was later updated in 2017 with Senate Bill 229 and Assembly Bill 494. These bills modified single-family zoning throughout California by requiring speedy local approval of up to 1,200 square foot secondary units on all residential property in California, including land zoned for single-family homes. In 2019, the law was updated with Assembly Bill 68 to allow up to 500 of the 1,200 square feet to be designated a "junior accessory dwelling unit"; some commentators said this amounted to de facto triplex zoning throughout the state.

In 2020, Senator Wiener introduced Senate Bill 902, which would require approval of 2 to 4 unit apartment buildings on single-family lots, depending on a city's size.

References

SB 50
Housing in California
SB 50